David Deniston Smith (born September 1, 1950) is an American businessman who is the executive chairman of Sinclair Broadcast Group (SBGI) since January 2017, having been its president and CEO from September 1990 to January 2017.

Early life
David Deniston Smith is the son of Julian Sinclair Smith (1921–1993), founder of Sinclair Broadcast Group, and Carolyn Beth Cunningham. He has three brothers, Frederick, J. Duncan and Robert.

Career
Smith began his career "selling pornographic videos in Baltimore's redlight district during the 1970s." He founded Comark Communications in 1978.

Smith served as the chief executive officer and president of Sinclair Television Group, Inc. from 1988 to January 2017. He "built Sinclair Broadcast Group Inc. into the largest owner of television stations in the U.S.," and he was profiled by the New York Times in 1998. He has served as its executive chairman of SBGI since January 1, 2017. It has been reported that every news station under Sinclair's umbrella is required to syndicate commentary that comports with its owners’ ideological views.

In September 2013, his shareholding in SBGI was valued at $268 million. His total calculated compensation was $5,206,439 as of fiscal year 2016.

Controversies
In an August 1996 prostitution sting, Smith was charged with committing an "unnatural and perverted sex act" (oral sex) in a Sinclair company vehicle. He was sentenced to community service, which was fulfilled by having Sinclair station WBFF produce reports on a local drug counseling program.

Prior to Ajit Pai's appointment as chairman of the FCC, Smith had met with Pai to discuss deregulation of the FCC's media ownership rules. This meeting, plus Sinclair having been granted additional access to Donald Trump's presidential campaign, resulted in accusations that Sinclair was currying favor with the Trump administration in exchange for deregulation of the industry.

References 

1950 births
Living people
People from Baltimore County, Maryland
Businesspeople from Maryland
American television executives